"Viaggia Insieme a Me" is a single from Eiffel 65's third album Eiffel 65.

Background
Keyboardist Maurizio Lobina wrote the song a year before his son's birth. The song reached #13 on the Italian Singles Chart.

Music video
The music video for the song features a boy walking, and two bullies throwing a ball to each other. One of the boys throws the ball at the boy, and punches him. The boy is taught karate from his dad, and the next time the boy gives the bully back the ball, he defends himself against the bully's attack. This deters the bullies from harassing him and earns their respect. The boy then starts hanging out with the bullies.

The video also features the band walking down a gravel road.

Track listing
Viaggia Insieme a Me (Fm Edit) - 3:44
Viaggia Insieme a Me (Album Mix) - 4:26
Viaggia Insieme a Me (Roberto Molinaro Radio Cut) - 4:24

Remixes and alternate versions

 After "Viaggia Insieme a Me" peaked, the Roberto Molinaro Radio Concept, called "Viaggia Insieme a Me RMX," was released as a single, but it failed to chart. It is featured on the second disc of the 2004 re-release of Eiffel 65.
 This song has also been released by Eiffel 65 with English lyrics called "Follow Me". The direct translation of the original Italian title is "Travel Together with Me".  "Follow Me" can be found on the album "Eiffel 65 (Special Edition)".

Chart positions

Weekly charts

Year-end charts

References

Eiffel 65 songs
2003 singles
Songs written by Maurizio Lobina
2003 songs